Qingniwaqiao is the downtown area of Dalian, Liaoning, China, located front of the Dalian Railway Station.  The area gives its name to a subdistrict in Zhongshan District, Qingniwaqiao Subdistrict.

History
Qingniwaqiao was originally a small fishing village in the 19th century whose name means the "bridge over the blue mud swamp".  It was near here where the Russians chose to build their commercial town, as they leased in 1898 the naval port of Lushun and its surrounding area, which they called Dalny. This later became the core of the city of Dalian.

Geography
Qingniwaqiao is a rectangular area, demarked on the northern side by Changjiang Road, on the southern side by Wuhui Road, on the eastern side by Jiefang Road and on the western side by Youhao Street.  In its center runs from east to west Zhongshan Road which is the main street of Dalian.

Dalian's central business district (CBD), extends from the east side of Qinagniwaqiao, along Zhongshan and Renmin Roads, via Friendship Square and Zhongshan Square, towards the Port of Dalian.  It sometimes includes Hope Square and Dalian Mori Building on Qingniwaqiao's west side, along Zhongshan Road.

Economy
Qingniwaqiao is Dalian's commercial center.  Dashang Group, the largest retailer in Northeast China has its flagship store here.

 Dashang Group
 Dashang Department Store
 MYKAL Department Store
 New Mart Supermarket
 Dashang Men's Store, on Jiefang Road
 Dashang Women's Store, on Zhongshan Road (formerly, Mitsukoshi Department Store
 Suning Appliance
 GOME Electrical Appliances
 Jiuguang Department Store
 Parkland

Restaurants and coffee shops from overseas:
 Pizza Hut
 McDonald's
 KFC
 Starbucks
 Amici

Victory Plaza
Invested by a Taiwan company, there is a 3-storey underground shopping area under Victory Plaza, sandwiched between Changjiang and Zhongshan Roads.  It is one of Dalian-ites' favorite pastimes to do (window) shopping or play bowling here, especially in winter.

Banks
 Branches of all major Chinese Nationwide banks
 Bank of Dalian headquarters

Banks in CBD
 Standard Chartered Bank
 Citibank
 Bank of East Asia
 Tokyo-Mitsubishi Bank
 Mizuho Bank

Hotels
 Swissôtel
 Ramada Hotel
 Zhongshan Hotel
 Bohai Hotel
 Kempinski Hotel

Hotels in CBD
 InterContinental Hotel
 New World Hotel
 Shangri-La Hotel
 Furama Hotel

Transportation
Qingniwaqiao is also the public transportation hub of Dalian City.

Intra-city transportation
Metro, bus, trolley bus and tramway

Inter-city transportation
 Long distance bus
 Railway (Dalian Railway Station)

See also
 List of township-level divisions of Liaoning
 Dalian
 Dashang Group
 Xi'an Road Commercial Zone

References

External links
 The General View of Qingniwaqiao Subdistrict, Zhongshan District, Dalian City (in Chinese)

Dalian
Township-level divisions of Liaoning
Subdistricts of the People's Republic of China